Kinvig  is a surname particularly associated with the Isle of Man. Notable people include:

 Alfred Kinvig (1874–1965), New Zealand cricketer.
 Clifford Kinvig (1934-2017), lecturer in war studies at the Royal Military Academy, Sandhurst, from a family of Isle of Man roots.
 Sage Kinvig (c.1870–1962), at the time of her death, one of the last surviving native speakers of the Manx language.

Manx people